The MV Chugach Ranger is a historic ranger boat whose home port is Petersburg, Alaska. She is the last wooden ranger boat in the fleet of the United States Forest Service operating in Southeast Alaska. She was designed by Seattle-based boat designer L. H. Coolidge and launched in Seattle in 1925. She has been in service ever since, transporting scientists, government officials, supplies, and guests throughout the areas administered by the Forest Service in southeastern Alaska, and performing search and rescue operations. First based in Cordova, she was assigned to the Tongass National Forest in 1953, and relocated to Petersburg.

The boat was listed on the National Register of Historic Places in 1992.

See also
National Register of Historic Places listings in Petersburg Census Area, Alaska

References

Tongass National Forest
Ships on the National Register of Historic Places in Alaska
National Register of Historic Places in Petersburg Borough, Alaska